Homps Minervois XIII  are a French Rugby league club based in Homps, Aude in the Languedoc-Roussillon region. The club plays in Pool A of the Languedoc-Roussillon League in the French National Division 2.

History
The current Homps open age team was reformed in the summer of 2008 after an absence of seven years. The previous incarnation won the French National 2 title in 2001. The club was linked with the signing of Ellery Hanley as a coach or backroom staff in late 2009, the announcement hoping to be made December 2009.

Club honours
French National 2
Winners - 2001

Club details
President: Jérôme Lignieres and Alain Garabedian
Club Address: Homps Minervois XIII, Avenue du Stade, Enclos Bourdier, 11200 Homps
Tel: 06 70 16 89 39
Contact:
Email: hompsminervois.treize@orange.fr

See also
 National Division 2

External links
Official Website

French rugby league teams
2008 establishments in France
Rugby clubs established in 2008